Donald Attig (born February 2, 1936 in Pontiac, Illinois) is an inventor, boat designer, entrepreneur, yachtsman and adventurer.

Biography
Attig attended St. Mary’s Grade School, Pontiac Township High School, Flanagan, Illinois High School, and Eureka College. He held several different jobs over the years.

While still in his twenties, Attig retired for the first time to carry out a record-setting voyage in a power cruiser he designed and built. Using it, he became the first man from the area to make a water journey from Seneca, Illinois, on the Illinois River to New Orleans, the terminus of the Mississippi River. From New Orleans, he moved around the Gulf Coast, eventually crossing the Gulf of Mexico to St. Petersburg, Florida, and cruised for a period on the yacht.

Donald Attig established three World Class Benchmark records in the Adventure and Endurance Challenge categories. In the late sixties, he developed a system for assembly line production of panelized, all-molded homes. Attig also created a Research Foundation, which he funded from his resources.

Toward the International Benchmark records 
In 1968, by permission of the Honorable Brian O’Kelly, he became the first person to build a three-mast sailing ship from the keel up in the US under the Irish Flag. For ten years,  Attig and his family lived and voyaged on the three-mast sailing ship. Attig skippered the vessel over 5,000 miles on rivers and the inland waterways system before putting it out to sea.  During this 5,000 mile voyage on inland waterways, Attig developed and honed the skills which decades later would carry him through the World Class Benchmark record establishing efforts. Attig sailed with his wife and newborn son to Ireland in 1977 and traveled to many other places. Two of his five children, Omar Brendan and John Paul, were born on the vessel.  For years, Attig and his son Omar operated free sailing excursions. These sailing excursions took place on the Schooner for at-risk youth with children of any religion from Northern Ireland during the troubles and others in need.  After his eldest son, Omar, who had been born on the ship, was involved in a fatal car crash, Attig turned the ship over to the VEC Youth Reach Program.

Benchmark Records in his seventies
Between the ages of 71 and 73, he was involved in establishing International Benchmark records in the fields of Endurance Challenge and Adventure Challenge:

In 2007, in a liveaboard boat without an engine, he organized and co-crewed in the first transit of the Shannon Navigation and beyond to the Seaport of Tarbert, County Kerry . He experienced boaters who understood the hazards involved in such a project thought it impossible. The River Shannon is the longest river in Ireland.

In 2008, he traveled the entire Shannon Navigation and beyond to the Seaport of Foynes, County Limerick, using the same liveaboard boat without an engine.

In 2008, he was the first person to transit the entire River Erne Navigation in a liveaboard boat without an engine.

These three distinct and different World-Class Benchmark establishing record efforts, when combined, involved moving over one ton of live aboard boat and gear over 600 miles (almost 1,000 kilometers) without an engine. Most of the distance was accomplished by rowing.

Additional Benchmark records that he established have included the total of miles transited in the combined efforts—a total of 600+ miles (960+ kilometers) over the bottom in the three contiguous years in an engineless liveaboard boat. Also, each record benchmark established over the three years has the additional claim of having a person over 70 involved in its establishment.

Shannon Benchmark records
The engineless transit, from the start of the Shannon Navigation at the Inishmagrath marker, on Lough Allen, in County Leitrim  to the end of Shannon Navigation at Killaloe, County Clare and beyond to the Port of Tarbot in the Sea Estuary, required dealing with 33 bridges, 6 locks, and nine lakes, without the mechanical power. Guides warn boaters, using large full-powered cruisers, to only cross the larger lakes in a company. The strong flow through many of the bridges often throws full- powered boats out of control, causing them to smash into the bridge piers. For example, the water flow through Killaloe Bridge can be 600 to 700 Tonnes per second. This hazard of losing control in or approaching bridges can result in major damage and an occasional sinking. Each of the four turbines at the Ardnacrusha power station, which is running, dumps 100 tons of water per second into the narrow, constricted, tailrace. This maelstrom must be negotiated for the transit to the estuary. Powerboats are advised to remain in the center of the tailrace and maintain high power. The prevailing wind is from the southwest and funnels up the Shannon channel. This is a great impediment to an un-powered cabin boat proceeding downstream.

2007 Benchmark
 During the 2007 record establishing effort, Jack Donovan of Ballincollig, Co. Cork (who was 60 at the time and had been living with full-blown Multiple sclerosis for over two decades) and Donnacha  rowed well over 90% of the time. Most of that was in a zig-zag pattern due to the wind resistance of the large topside area and almost flat box type bow of the one-ton plus of live-aboard boat and gear.

Shannon navigation attempt
Donald Attig and Jack Donovan started their benchmark establishing effort on June 29, 2007, at Cormongan beach on Lough Allen at 10 A.M. They rowed from that spot to the Inismagrath "end of navigation" marker at the top of Lough Allen. They began the first-ever attempt to make an engineless transit of the Shannon in a boat equipped with live-aboard accommodations. Mr. Stephan Haeni, a Swiss National living at Cleighran More, witnessed their arrival and departure at the Inismagrath Marker. They completed the Shannon Navigation on Saturday, July 28, 2007, entering the Killaloe canal at 4:20 P.M. At that point, the official Shannon Navigation had been transited in an engineless live-aboard boat.

Beyond the Shannon navigation
The Irish Coast Guard attempted to dissuade the pair from continuing on past the end of the navigation marker at the Killaloe Bridge. Jack and Donald left the Killaloe Canal at 4:20 P.M. on July 28, 2007. They dropped anchor in the bay of the sea port of Tarbert, County Kerry at 8 P.M. on August 8, establishing the final Benchmark records of their effort. Senior Citizens Jack Donovan and Donald Attig were the first crew to transit the entire River Shannon Navigation and beyond in an engineless boat with full live-aboard capability.  Their record-setting efforts were carried out during the wettest summer on the Shannon since 1947 and 48. The vessel and gear which they used in the benchmark record establishing effort weighed over one ton.

2008 Single-handed feat
Donald Attig established more Adventure Challenge and Endurance Challenge records by making the same basic trip single handed in the same vessel, Omar’s River Bird. RTÉ's Nationwide produced a segment about Shannon Challenge 2008 which aired on June 6, 2008.

At 1:30 A.M. June 26, Donald Attig started at Cormongan beach on Lough Allen, in County Leitrim. He was driven back by the wind and had to anchor  from the beach. It was over two days before he could lift anchor and start for the marker at Inismagrath. At 12:05 A.M. on August 16, 2008, he reached the Seaport of Foynes.

2009 More Benchmark Records
 Donald Attig became the first person to complete the entire River Erne Navigation single-handed in an engineless live aboard boat. He used the same boat for this effort as was used in 2007 and 2008. There are enough hazards on the Erne Navigation to make passage in an engineless boat large enough to be liveaboard a world-class challenge. The Northern Ireland tourist site warns that Upper Lough Erne is a shallow maze and that waves on Lower Lough Erne can reach open-sea dimensions. Violent wind shears from the cliffs of Mago can create grave difficulties for full-powered cruisers at any time. All this combines to create a formidable challenge for an engineless boat that has the windage connected with live-aboard accommodations. This Benchmark Record Establishing effort started at Belturbet, Co Cavan August 6, at 6:30 P.M. It was attended by a number of dignitaries. The effort was completed Sunday, August 30 at 7:45 P.M. at the Public dock in Belleek, County Fermanagh.

Efforts witnessed and supported
All three of the above Benchmark establishing efforts were witnessed by thousands of persons and recorded at length in the media and press. The members of the Inland Waterways Association of Ireland supported, followed and chronicled the efforts. In 2007 the Lough Derg branch of IWAI awarded the boat and crew honorary membership in their annual Lough Derg rally.  In the same year, the IWAI Cruising Club formally welcomed the boat into Foynes harbor, as it returned after completing the Benchmark establishing efforts at Tarbert. The club also made the crew and boat officially part of the 2007 Killaloe to Killrush Cruise in Company.

Fabricated housing
 From 1968 to 1971, Attig developed the world’s first all-molded conventional appearing housing system. Attig designed the system and produced the first small panels in his plastic company located on Route 66 at Pontiac, Illinois. Then, he  produced full-sized molds and directed the production of the prototype in the Dura Plex Industries Plant located in Herrin Illinois. This received attention within the industry  22 national governments sent representatives to the grand opening of the prototype on the Du Quoin, Illinois State Fairgrounds.

References

External links
 Shannon Rower Donald Attig reaches Limerick
Donald Sets Sail in Bid to Help Orphan
Inventor: Donald B. Attig
Don't forget to watch RTE Nationwide this weekend on the 6th July
RTE Nationwide link to BOY OF HOPE segment
70 year old will row and sail the length of the river Erne
South African Ambassador in Belturbet
Information site about the Erne and its hazards
Don Attig has set off today from Donoughmore again
Link to Donald Attig's article on the Glouster Depth Sounder
Don Attig's Boat Journey pictures

People from Pontiac, Illinois
1936 births
Living people
Single-handed sailors
20th-century American inventors